Human Target is a detective comic book character associated with DC Comics.

Human Target may also refer to:

Film and television
 Human Target (film), a 1974 Australian film
 Human Target (1992 TV series), on the American Broadcasting Company, based loosely on the comic book character
 Human Target (2010 TV series), on the Fox Broadcasting Company, based loosely on the comic book character
 Human Target (Arrowverse), a fictional character appearing in the Arrowverse television franchise
 "Human Target (Arrow episode)", an episode of Arrow

Music
 Human Target (album), a 2019 album by the Australian band Thy Art Is Murder
 "Human Target", a song by American death metal band Six Feet Under on the album Haunted

Other uses
 Human Target (Vertigo), a comic series based on the comic book character